The 1947–48 Colorado College Tigers men's ice hockey season was the 9th season of play for the program but first under the oversight of the NCAA. The Tigers represented Colorado College and were coached by Cheddy Thompson, in his 3rd season.

Season

Roster

Standings

Schedule and results

|-
!colspan=12 style=";" | Regular Season

|-
!colspan=12 style=";" | 

Note: The University of Omaha played under club status at this time and was not a varsity program until 1997.

Scoring statistics

References

Colorado College Tigers men's ice hockey seasons
Colorado College
Colorado College
Colorado College
DartmColorado Collegeouth